Antonella Valentini (born 3 November 1958) is an Italian former swimmer. She competed in the women's 800 metre freestyle at the 1972 Summer Olympics.

References

1958 births
Living people
Italian female swimmers
Olympic swimmers of Italy
Swimmers at the 1972 Summer Olympics
Swimmers from Rome
Italian female freestyle swimmers